Art Martynuska (April 17, 1930 – December 24, 2006) was an athletic director and head football coach at Saint Francis University.

Career
Martynuska served in a variety of roles at Saint Francis from 1968 to 1984, including head football coach (1969–81), assistant basketball coach (1968–78), and director of athletics (1979–84). He resigned as football coach on May 7, 1982, citing health issues. He later resigned his role as athletics director on June 1, 1984, and transitioned to assistant director of counseling at the school.

He was posthumously inducted into the Saint Francis University Athletics Hall of Fame in 2007.

Family
Martynuska was married for over 50 years, and had three children.

Head coaching record

References

 

1930 births
2006 deaths
Saint Francis Red Flash athletic directors
Saint Francis Red Flash football coaches
Saint Francis Red Flash men's basketball coaches
People from Cambria County, Pennsylvania